Eudes Lacerda Medeiros (born 8 April 1955), known as Eudes, is a Brazilian former footballer who played as a midfielder. He competed in the men's tournament at the 1976 Summer Olympics and won a gold medal in football at the 1975 Pan American Games.

References

External links
 

1955 births
Living people
Brazilian footballers
Association football midfielders
Brazil international footballers
Olympic footballers of Brazil
Footballers at the 1976 Summer Olympics
Footballers from São Paulo
Pan American Games gold medalists for Brazil
Pan American Games medalists in football
Footballers at the 1975 Pan American Games
Medalists at the 1975 Pan American Games